Patrick Smith (August 28, 1963 – June 18, 2019) was an American Kickboxer and mixed martial artist. He started his mixed martial arts career by participating in the first two Ultimate Fighting Championship events.

He was a 3rd degree black belt in Tae Kwon Do and also held a black belt in Hapkido, Kempo Karate, and Tang Soo Do. In 1993, Smith was ranked No. 1 as a Super Heavyweight Kickboxer in the United States and held a ranking of No. 5 internationally. He was the 1993 Enshin Karate Sabaki Challenge Heavyweight champion, an annual full contact karate tournament held in Denver which allows grabs, sweeps and throws, and competed in the 1993 Seidokaikan full contact Karate World Cup tournament in Japan.

Kickboxing career
Patrick Smith first rose to fame in the US for his kickboxing prowess.  In 1994 he entered the K-1 Grand Prix '94 where he caused one of the biggest upsets in K-1 history by flooring three times and subsequently knocking out legendary karateka and future K-1 star Andy Hug with an uppercut after just 19 seconds of the first round in their quarterfinal match. Smith was unable to build on this success as he was soundly defeated by eventual champion Peter Aerts in the semifinals. Some pundits, most notoriously Dave Meltzer, have expressed their belief that Hug's loss was a fight fixed in order to increase Smith's popularity.

After the Hug victory, Smith's K-1 career never took off. He lost to Andy Hug in a rematch at the K-1 Revenge event and then failed to qualify for the following year's K-1 Grand Prix at K-1 Grand Prix '95 Opening Battle.  His last match in K-1 was against rising local star Musashi, a match he lost by KO, and he was released from his K-1 contract, finishing 1 and 4 with the organization.  Despite little international success, Smith had more success at home, accumulating an overall 66-8 kickboxing record by the time he retired in 2000.

Mixed martial arts career

Ultimate Fighting Championship
Smith participated the first Ultimate Fighting Championship event, UFC 1, in November 1993. The event featured an eight-man single-elimination tournament with very few rules, awarding $50,000 to the winner. Art Davie, the promoter, placed advertisements in martial arts magazines and sent letters to anyone in any martial arts directory he could find to recruit competitors for the event. With the event being held in Smith's hometown of Denver, he was an easy addition. Smith's first and only match was against shoot wrestler Ken Shamrock, who took Smith down easily and submitted him with a heel hook. The fans in Denver booed heavily as they were unaware of the submission rules and were displeased with the fact that the match ended so quickly without a knockout.

Despite his loss, Smith's performance got him invited to UFC 2, now a 16-man tournament, where he entered with the expressed intent of a shot at the previous winner Royce Gracie. Smith had spent the time between shows working on his grappling to perform better on the ground, which paid off with a victory by guillotine choke against Ray Wizard in the first round. The peak of his performance, however, came technically through striking: after being pitted against ninjutsu fighter Scott Morris in the second round, Smith dropped him with knee strikes from the clinch, mounted him on the ground, and then unloaded barrage after barrage of punches and elbow strikes, completely knocking Morris out. This finish is considered one of the most brutal in the history of UFC. Smith next fought karate expert Johnny Rhodes, whom he submitted with a second guillotine choke after a brief exchange of hits. Finally, Smith reached the finals and his desired match against Royce Gracie, but it was short and one-sided, with Gracie taking him down and landing several palm strikes from mount before the kickboxer tapped out.

Smith returned at UFC 6 facing Rudyard Moncayo, a kenpo karate stylist from Ecuador. He opened the fight in spectacular fashion by landing a running front kick to Moncayo's chest, knocking him down and sending him sliding towards the fence. Smith then followed with a takedown and gained mount position, and ultimately locked a rear naked choke when Moncayo tried to escape, making him tap out. However, Smith had to withdraw from the tournament due to stomach cramps caused by an injury sustained during the fight. He was replaced by Anthony Macias.

Post-UFC
Smith went on to fight for K-1 and Bas Rutten's first three invitationals shows, as well as fighting on a few of the World Vale Tudo Championship (WVC) events showcasing No Holds Barred fighting. At WVC 3, Smith faced Fabio Gurgel in a match that became infamous for its unusual ending. Smith grabbed the ring ropes in order to avoid being taken down and struck Gurgel's spine repeatedly with his elbow, but crowd members approached and tried to take Smith's hands off from the ropes, prompting the match to be stopped. The referee consulted with promoter Sérgio Batarelli about the situation and it was decided to call off the fight and declare Gurgel the winner. In an elimination tournament of eight fighters at WVC 5 held in Recife, Brazil on 3 February 1998, Smith withdrew ahead of his scheduled semifinal bout against Igor Vovchanchyn after he suffered a broken hand in his quarterfinal win over Marco Selva.

On April 11, 2008, Smith came in as a late replacement for Gary Goodridge and defeated Eric "Butterbean" Esch via submission due to strikes in a "Masters Superfight" at YAMMA Pit Fighting's inaugural event.

On October 10, 2015, Smith came out of retirement at age 51 to fight Dave Huckaba at Gladiator Challenge - Collision Course. He was defeated via KO at 1:33 of round 1.

Sex offences
In 1999, Smith was convicted of sexually assaulting a 14-year-old girl. He was later arrested in 2008 after failing to register as a sex offender.

Death
On June 18, 2019, Smith died of sarcomatoid carcinoma of the bladder and  Sarcomatoid  carcinomas variant  of urotherlia (SVUC) at age 55. His death is possibly attributed to his addiction of Chewing tobacco.

Championships and accomplishments

Karate
Sabaki Challenge
Sabaki Challenge Heavyweight Champion

Kickboxing
Karate International Council of Kickboxing
KICK Super Heavyweight Champion

Mixed martial arts
Ultimate Fighting Championship
UFC 2 Tournament Runner-Up
UFC 6 Tournament Semifinalist
Record for most wins in one night by a Runner-Up (three)
Tied (Royce Gracie) for most fights fought in one night (four)

Kickboxing record

|-  style="background:#fbb;"
| 1997-06-25 || Loss ||align=left| Jeff Roufus ||  || Ledyard, Connecticut, USA || TKO (Leg Kick) || 2 ||
|-
! style=background:white colspan=9 |
|-  style="background:#fbb;"
| 1995-09-03 || Loss ||align=left| Musashi || K-1 Revenge II || Yokohama, Japan || KO (Kick) || 2 || 0:43
|-  style="background:#fbb;"
| 1995-03-03 || Loss ||align=left| Stan Longinidis || K-1 Grand Prix '95 Opening Battle || Tokyo, Japan || KO (Kick) || 2 || 2:59
|-
! style=background:white colspan=9 |
|-  style="background:#fbb;"
| 1994-09-18 || Loss ||align=left| Andy Hug || K-1 Revenge || Yokohama, Japan || KO (Left Knee) || 1 || 0:56
|-  style="background:#fbb;"
| 1994-04-30 || Loss ||align=left| Peter Aerts || K-1 Grand Prix '94 Semifinals || Tokyo, Japan || KO (Right Overhand) || 1 || 1:03
|-  style="background:#cfc;"
| 1994-04-30 || Win ||align=left| Andy Hug || K-1 Grand Prix '94 Quarterfinals || Tokyo, Japan || KO (Three Knockdowns) || 1 || 0:19
|-
| colspan=9 | Legend:

Mixed martial arts record

|-
|Loss
|align=center| 20–17
| Sean Loeffler
| KO (head kick)
| Gladiator Challenge: Freedom Strikes
| 
|align=center| 1
|align=center| 0:08
|El Cajon, California, United States
|
|-
|Loss
|align=center| 20–16
| Dave Huckaba
| KO (punch)
| Gladiator Challenge: Collision Course 
| 
|align=center| 1
|align=center| 1:33
|Lincoln, California, United States
|
|-
|Loss
|align=center| 20–15
| Kevin Jordan
| Decision (unanimous)
| American Steel Cagefighting 1: Battle of the Legends
| 
|align=center| 3
|align=center| 5:00
|Salem, New Hampshire, United States
|
|-
|Win
|align=center| 20–14
| Brad Imes
| KO (punches)
| Titan FC 13
| 
|align=center| 1
|align=center| 0:28
|Kansas City, Missouri, United States
|
|-
|Win
|align=center| 19–14
| Aaron Winterlee
| Submission (neck crank)
| FM: Productions
| 
|align=center| 1
|align=center| 2:22
|Springfield, Missouri, United States
|
|-
|Loss
|align=center| 18–14
| Jeremiah Constant
| TKO (submission to punches)
| HRP: Snakebite Fight 2
| 
|align=center| 1
|align=center| 0:42
|Tulsa, Oklahoma, United States
|
|-
|Win
|align=center| 18–13
| Aaron Winterlee
| Submission (guillotine choke)
| Extreme Fighting League
| 
|align=center| 2
|align=center| 1:11
|Miami, Oklahoma, United States
|
|-
|Win
|align=center| 17–13
| Butterbean
| TKO (submission to punches and elbows)
| YAMMA Pit Fighting
| 
|align=center| 1
|align=center| 3:17
|Atlantic City, New Jersey, United States
|
|-
|Win
|align=center| 16–13
| Derrick Ruffin
| TKO (punches)
| FM: Productions
| 
|align=center| 2
|align=center| 1:02
|Missouri, United States
|
|-
|Win
|align=center| 15–13
| David Tyner
| TKO (punches)
| Oklahoma KO: Nightmare in the Jungle 1
| 
|align=center| 2
|align=center| 2:45
|Adair, Oklahoma, United States
|
|-
|Win
|align=center| 14–13
| Scott Arnold
| TKO (punches)
| UGC 18: Xtreme Victory
| 
|align=center| 1
|align=center| 2:12
|Quebec, Canada
|
|-
|Loss
|align=center| 13–13
| Tom Clemens
| Submission (kneebar)
| XFS 5: Heavy Hitters
| 
|align=center| 2
|align=center| 1:35
|Boise, Idaho, United States
|
|-
|Win
|align=center| 13–12
| Brian Stromberg
| KO (punches)
| Xtreme Fight Series 3
| 
|align=center| 1
|align=center| 4:00
|Boise, Idaho, United States
|
|-
|Win
|align=center| 12–12
| Vernon Earwood
| TKO (knee and punches)
| RMBB: Hellraisers
| 
|align=center| 1
|align=center| 2:33
|Denver, Colorado, United States
|
|-
|Win
|align=center| 11–12
| Richard Gomez
| Submission (guillotine choke)
| Fightfest 6
| 
|align=center| 1
|align=center| 0:47
|Corpus Christi, Texas, United States
|
|-
|Win
|align=center| 10–12
| Allan Sullivan
| KO (punches)
| ROF 10: Intensity
| 
|align=center| 1
|align=center| 3:35
|Colorado, United States
|
|-
|Loss
|align=center| 9–12
| Marcus Silveira
| DQ (knees on a grounded opponent)
| World Extreme Fighting 5
| 
|align=center| 1
|align=center| 0:50
|DeLand, Florida, United States
|
|-
|Win
|align=center| 9–11
| Chuck Gale
| TKO (elbows and punches)
| Bas Rutten Invitational 3
| 
|align=center| 1
|align=center| 7:31
|Littleton, Colorado, United States
|
|-
|Loss
|align=center| 8–11
| Maxim Tarasov
| Submission (heel hook)
| IAFC: Pankration World Championship 1999
| 
|align=center| 1
|align=center| 3:31
|Moscow, Russia
|
|-
|Loss
|align=center| 8–10
| Moti Horenstein
| KO (head kick)
| Bas Rutten Invitational 2
| 
|align=center| 1
|align=center| 0:26
|Littleton, Colorado, United States
|
|-
|Loss
|align=center| 8–9
| Matt Asher
| TKO (punches)
| Bas Rutten Invitational 1
| 
|align=center| 1
|align=center| 0:11
|Littleton, Colorado, United States
|
|-
|Win
|align=center| 8–8
| Joe Grant
| TKO (submission to punches)
| Bas Rutten Invitational 1
| 
|align=center| 1
|align=center| 0:35
|Littleton, Colorado, United States
|
|-
|Win
|align=center| 7–8
| David Dodd
| Decision (unanimous)
| Extreme Challenge 22
| 
|align=center| 1
|align=center| 16:00
|West Valley City, Utah, United States
|
|-
|Win
|align=center| 6–8
| Tony Mendoza
| TKO (punches)
| ES: National Championships
| 
|align=center| 1
|align=center| 7:27
|South Dakota, United States
|
|-
|Win
|align=center| 5–8
| Marco Selva
| TKO (submission to punches)
| World Vale Tudo Championship 5
| 
|align=center| 1
|align=center| 4:35
|Recife, Brazil
|
|-
|Loss
|align=center| 4–8
| Marco Ruas
| Submission (heel hook)
| World Vale Tudo Championship 4
| 
|align=center| 1
|align=center| 0:39
|Rio de Janeiro, Brazil
|
|-
|Loss
|align=center| 4–7
| Fabio Gurgel
| TKO (retirement due to fan interference)
| World Vale Tudo Championship 3
| 
|align=center| 1
|align=center| 0:50
|Rio de Janeiro, Brazil
|
|-
|Loss
|align=center| 4–6
| Dave Beneteau
| TKO (submission to punches
| U: Japan
| 
|align=center| 1
|align=center| 1:09
|Tokyo, Japan
|
|-
|Loss
|align=center| 4–5
| Kiyoshi Tamura
| Submission (heel hook)
| K-1 Hercules
| 
|align=center| 1
|align=center| 0:55
|Nagoya, Japan
|
|-
|Loss
|align=center| 4–4
| Kimo Leopoldo
| TKO (submission to punches)
| UFCF 1
| 
|align=center| 1
|align=center| 2:59
|Sapporo, Japan
|
|-
|Win
|align=center| 4–3
| Rudyard Moncayo
| Submission (rear-naked choke)
| UFC 6
| 
|align=center| 1
|align=center| 1:08
|Casper, Wyoming, United States
|
|-
|Loss
|align=center| 3–3
| Kimo Leopoldo
| TKO (submission to punches)
| K-1 Legend
| 
|align=center| 1
|align=center| 3:00
|Nagoya, Japan
|
|-
|Loss
|align=center| 3–2
| Royce Gracie
| TKO (submission to punches)
| rowspan=4|UFC 2
| rowspan=4|
|align=center| 1
|align=center| 1:17
|rowspan=4|Denver, Colorado, United States
|
|-
|Win
|align=center| 3–1
| Johnny Rhodes
| Submission (guillotine choke)
|align=center| 1
|align=center| 1:07
|
|-
|Win
|align=center| 2–1
| Scott Morris
| TKO (elbows)
|align=center| 1
|align=center| 0:30
|
|-
|Win
|align=center| 1–1
| Ray Wizard
| Submission (guillotine choke)
|align=center| 1
|align=center| 0:58
|
|-
|Loss
|align=center| 0–1
| Ken Shamrock
| Technical Submission (heel hook)
| UFC 1
| 
|align=center| 1
|align=center| 1:49
|Denver, Colorado, United States
|
|-

Professional boxing record

|-
|align="center" colspan=8|5 Wins (4 knockouts, 1 decision), 11 Losses (11 knockouts), 2 Draws 
|-
| align="center" style="border-style: none none solid solid; background: #e3e3e3"|Result
| align="center" style="border-style: none none solid solid; background: #e3e3e3"|Record
| align="center" style="border-style: none none solid solid; background: #e3e3e3"|Opponent
| align="center" style="border-style: none none solid solid; background: #e3e3e3"|Type
| align="center" style="border-style: none none solid solid; background: #e3e3e3"|Round
| align="center" style="border-style: none none solid solid; background: #e3e3e3"|Date
| align="center" style="border-style: none none solid solid; background: #e3e3e3"|Location
| align="center" style="border-style: none none solid solid; background: #e3e3e3"|Notes
|-align=center
|Loss
|
|align=left| Kendrick Releford
|KO
|1
|June 13, 2009
|align=left| Batesville Armory, Batesville, Arkansas, U.S.
|align=left|
|-
|Loss
|
|align=left| Grant Cudjoe
|TKO
|2
|August 4, 2007
|align=left| Expo Square Pavilion, Tulsa, Oklahoma, U.S.
|align=left|
|-
|Loss
|
|align=left| Chazz Witherspoon
|TKO
|2
|February 2, 2007
|align=left| Jewish Community Center, Philadelphia, Pennsylvania
|align=left|
|-
|Loss
|
|align=left| Taurus Sykes
|KO
|3
|December 12, 2006
|align=left| Isleta Casino Resort, Isleta Pueblo, New Mexico, U.S.
|align=left|
|-
|Loss
|
|align=left| Duncan Dokiwari
|KO
|2
|August 26, 2006
|align=left| Convention Center, Junction City, Kansas, U.S.
|align=left|
|-
|Win
|
|align=left| Kenny Lemos
|TKO
|2
|June 30, 2006
|align=left| Denver Coliseum, Denver, Colorado, U.S.
|align=left|
|-
|Loss
|
|align=left| David Bostice
|TKO
|3
|August 12, 2005
|align=left| Pepsi Center, Denver, Colorado, U.S.
|align=left|
|-
|Loss
|
|align=left| Marcelino Novaes
|TKO
|2
|July 23, 2004
|align=left| Agua Caliente Casino Resort Spa, Rancho Mirage, California, U.S.
|align=left|
|-
|Draw
|
|align=left| Preston Hartzog
|PTS
|6
|June 11, 2004
|align=left| Longshoreman's Hall, San Francisco, California, U.S.
|align=left|
|-
|Draw
|
|align=left| Gary "Bring Da Pain" Bell
|PTS
|8
|May 27, 2004
|align=left| Alario Center, Westwego, Louisiana, U.S.
|align=left|
|-
|Loss
|
|align=left| Bobby Harris
|KO
|2
|August 31, 1994
|align=left| Las Vegas, Nevada, U.S.
|align=left|
|-
|Loss
|
|align=left| Monte Oswald
|TKO
|2
|April 21, 1994
|align=left| Las Vegas, Nevada, U.S.
|align=left|
|-
|Win
|
|align=left| Justin Fortune
|KO
|2
|February 24, 1994
|align=left| Las Vegas, Nevada, U.S.
|align=left|
|-
|Win
|
|align=left| Krishna Wainwright
|PTS
|6
|January 12, 1994
|align=left| Las Vegas, Nevada, U.S.
|align=left|
|-
|Win
|
|align=left| Randy Crippen
|TKO
|1
|August 18, 1993
|align=left| Las Vegas, Nevada, U.S.
|align=left|
|-
|Loss
|
|align=left| Will Hinton
|KO
|2
|March 20, 1993
|align=left| Denver, Colorado, U.S.
|align=left|
|-
|Loss
|
|align=left| Samson Po'uha
|TKO
|4
|February 14, 1993
|align=left| Las Vegas, Nevada, U.S.
|align=left|
|-
|Win
|
|align=left|Kris Sorensen
|KO
|1
|May 12, 1992
|align=left| O'Conner Fieldhouse, Caldwell, Idaho, U.S.
|align=left|
|}

References

External links

1963 births
2019 deaths
People from Coalgate, Oklahoma
Boxers from Colorado
Boxers from Oklahoma
American hapkido practitioners
American male karateka
American male kickboxers
American people convicted of child sexual abuse
American sportspeople convicted of crimes
Kickboxers from Colorado
Kickboxers from Oklahoma
Heavyweight kickboxers
American practitioners of Brazilian jiu-jitsu
American male taekwondo practitioners
American tang soo do practitioners
American male mixed martial artists
African-American mixed martial artists
Mixed martial artists from Colorado
Mixed martial artists from Oklahoma
Heavyweight mixed martial artists
Mixed martial artists utilizing American Kenpo
Mixed martial artists utilizing Tang Soo Do
Mixed martial artists utilizing taekwondo
Mixed martial artists utilizing Seidokaikan
Mixed martial artists utilizing hapkido
Mixed martial artists utilizing boxing
Mixed martial artists utilizing Brazilian jiu-jitsu
American male boxers
Ultimate Fighting Championship male fighters
20th-century African-American sportspeople
21st-century African-American people